Chaetolopha niphosticha is a moth in the family Geometridae. It is found in Australia (Queensland, New South Wales and Victoria).

Its wings are brown with three white sinuous lines across the forewings and a white dash near the apex. The hindwings are in the basal half, and darker in the marginal half.

The larvae probably feed on Polypodiophyta species.

References

Moths described in 1907
Larentiinae
Moths of Australia